The Cortes of Castile and León (Spanish: Cortes de Castilla y León) is the elected unicameral legislature of the Autonomous Community of Castile and León.

The tradition of the regional Cortes is traced back to the Royal Council (Latin: Curia Regis) of León (1188). The Curia Regis was a king's summons of the estates of the realm. Although the practical outcome of the Curia Regis of 1188 is still disputed, its charter seems to be an early move towards the rule of constitutional law, much like Magna Carta. The  Cortes of Castile and León is seated in the city of Valladolid.

See also
List of presidents of the Cortes of Castile and León

References

 
1983 establishments in Castile and León
Castile and Leon